Amata alicia  is a species of moth of the subfamily Arctiinae. It occurs throughout Africa, from Morocco to South Africa.

The adults look similar to Amata cerbera.

Larvae feed on coffee plants, Bidens pilosa, Cupressus, Dahlia and Manihot glaziovii.

The amata alicia is commonly found in Angola, Botswana, Burundi, Cameroon, the Democratic Republic of Congo, Ethiopia, Gabon, Kenya, Mozambique, Morocco, Namibia, Nigeria, Rwanda, Somalia, South Africa, Tanzania, Zambia and Zimbabwe.

Subspecies
 Amata alicia alicia
 Amata alicia damarensis (Grünberg, 1910)
 Amata alicia hoggariensis (Alberti & Alberti, 1978)

References 

 www.afromoths.net

alicia
Moths of Africa
Moths described in 1876